Kerry McCluggage (born 29 November 1954) is the owner and president of Craftsman Films, an independent production company developing motion picture and television content. He was Chairman of Paramount Television Group and President of Universal Television for more than ten years each. He was a co-founder of United Paramount Network (UPN). At Paramount Television, he oversaw programs such as  Cheers , its spinoff Frasier  ,  the Star Trek  franchise, Entertainment Tonight   , The Arsenio Hall Show   , Judge Judy  , Judge Joe Brown   and Judge Mills Lane  . and grew the operation from $700 million to $3.2 billion, making it one of the leading television production companies. From mid-2018 until the end of 2018, McCluggage was CEO of IDW Media Holdings (Idea and Design Works), a subdivision of IDW Publishing.

Education
At the University of Southern California, McCluggage studied broadcasting and film and became a member of the Sigma Chi fraternity. He later gained his MBA at the Harvard Business School, graduating in 1978. He currently serves on the Sigma Chi Foundation Board of Governors.

Kerry McCluggage birthday is October 20, 1954

Filmography
McCluggage has developed and supervised many television series including: The A-Team, Coach, Deadwood, The Equalizer, Frasier, JAG, Northern Exposure, Law & Order, Miami Vice, Murder She Wrote, Knight Rider, Quantum Leap, Cheers, and Entertainment Tonight.

While an executive at Universal Pictures, he also worked on The Breakfast Club, Out of Africa and Cocktail.

References

American television executives
Paramount Global people
Paramount Pictures executives
American film studio executives
Harvard Business School alumni
University of Southern California alumni
Living people
1954 births
Place of birth missing (living people)